Yazır is a village in the District of Karacasu, Aydın Province, Turkey. As of 2010, it had a population of 528 people.

References

Villages in Karacasu District